Graham Thorne Dowling  (born 4 March 1937) is a former New Zealand cricketer who played 39 Test matches and captained New Zealand in 19 of them. He led New Zealand to its first victory in a Test series, against Pakistan in November 1969. He was a specialist right-handed batsman who usually opened the innings.

Domestic career
Dowling captained Canterbury from 1962–63 to 1971–72. He led Canterbury to victory in New Zealand's inaugural one-day competition in 1971–72, when he won the Man of the Match award in both the semi-final and the final.

International career
Dowling captained the New Zealand Test team in 19 consecutive matches from 1968 to 1972. He led New Zealand to its first Test victories over India and Pakistan.

His finest moment came at Christchurch in 1967–68 when he made a nine-hour 239 that led to New Zealand's first victory against India. It was his first match as captain, and he was the only player to score a double century on his captaincy debut until the feat was equalled by Shivnarine Chanderpaul against South Africa in 2005. At the time, his 239 was the highest Test score for New Zealand. Nevertheless, New Zealand lost the two remaining Tests of the series to go down 1–3.

Dowling led New Zealand in 12 Tests in 1969, including three victories. They beat West Indies in Wellington in March, and shared the three-Test series 1–1. On a long nine-Test tour from June to November, they lost to England 0–2, shared the series with India 1–1, then beat Pakistan 1–0, New Zealand's first victory in a Test series.

He lost the middle finger of his left hand in 1970 after suffering an injury on the brief tour to Australia in 1969–70. On the tour to the West Indies in 1971–72 he suffered a back injury and had to return home after the Second Test. It was his last first-class match.

After cricket
In the 1987 New Year Honours, Dowling was appointed an Officer of the Order of the British Empire, for services to cricket.

References

External links 
 
 Graham Dowling reflects on his career

New Zealand Test cricket captains
New Zealand Test cricketers
New Zealand cricketers
Canterbury cricketers
1937 births
Living people
New Zealand Officers of the Order of the British Empire
South Island cricketers